Automotodrom Grobnik is a  motorsport race track located in Čavle,  north of Rijeka, Croatia. The circuit was built in 15 months and was opened in 14 September 1978. From 1978 to 1990, it hosted the Yugoslavian motorcycle Grand Prix of MotoGP.

Currently, among other competitions, the automotodrom hosts the Croatia Prix, which is a valid race for the FIA CEZ Formula 3 Championship.

In 2020, Rijeka also hosted NASCAR Whelen Euro Series rounds as a late replacement for Autodrom Most, whose round was cancelled late in the season due to COVID-19 restrictions. It has featured on the NASCAR Whelen Euro Series calendar also in 2021 and 2022, and it will feature on the 2023 NASCAR Whelen Euro Series as a non-championship all star endurance race.

World Championship races

Lap records 

The official race lap records at the Automotodrom Grobnik are listed as:

See also
Preluk Circuit

Notes

References

External links
Track information
Homepage

FIA Grade 4 circuit
Grobnik
Motorsport venues in Croatia
Sport in Yugoslavia
Sports venues in Rijeka